Provincial Ovalle is a Chilean football team. They currently play in Third Division A of Chilean Football, and have played in Copa Chile.

Players

Honours

References 

Football clubs in Chile